Aegiphila glomerata is a species of flowering plant in the family Lamiaceae. It is endemic to Ecuador, where it has been found at only three locations. It occurs in low-elevation coastal dry forests.

References

glomerata
Endemic flora of Ecuador
Critically endangered plants
Taxonomy articles created by Polbot